Baxmal is a district of Jizzakh Region in Uzbekistan. The capital lies at the town Oʻsmat.

The district consists of 7 urban-type settlements (Oʻsmat, Oqtosh, Mo'g'ol, Novqa, Alamli, Tongotar, Baxmal) and 10 rural communities.

References 

Districts of Uzbekistan
Jizzakh Region